"Forever Yours" is a song by Japanese J-pop group Every Little Thing, released as the group's ninth single on June 17, 1998. It was their third single to hit the top spot on the Oricon chart.

Track listing
 Forever Yours
(Words & Music - Mitsuru Igarashi) 
 Forever Yours (Angelic Summer Mix)
 Forever Yours (Instrumental)

Chart positions

External links
 Forever Yours information at Avex Network.
 Forever Yours information at Oricon.

1998 singles
Every Little Thing (band) songs
Oricon Weekly number-one singles
Songs written by Mitsuru Igarashi
1998 songs